The 1909–10 Pittsburgh men's ice hockey season was the 6th season of play for the program.

Season
Pittsburgh formed a local Intercollegiate League with Carnegie Tech and Penn State. With the demise of the WPHL the year before the Duquesne Gardens had plenty of available ice time and the arena's operators agreed not only to host all games between the three teams but to assume all resulting financial obligations. The schedule began in December 1909 with a 2–2 tie between the Panthers and the Tartans. Penn State lost two games around Christmas (one to Pittsburgh) but soon thereafter the faculty at Penn State required their team to withdraw from the league and return to campus. Pittsburgh and Carnegie Tech played two more times with the Tartans winning both. Case and Western Reserve, colleges located in the Cleveland area, were both invited to join the League after Penn State's departure, but neither school responded.

Very little enthusiasm for the program was expressed by the student body, according to contemporary reports. With an unenthusiastic audience and a dearth of competition the Panthers shuttered their program.

Roster

Standings

Schedule and Results

|-
!colspan=12 style=";" | Regular Season

References

Pittsburgh Panthers men's ice hockey seasons
Pittsburgh
Pittsburgh
Pittsburgh
Pittsburgh